These are the team rosters of the nations that participated in the women's ice hockey tournament of the 2006 Winter Olympics.

Canada

Finland

Germany

Italy

Russian Federation
The following is the Russian roster in the women's ice hockey tournament of the 2006 Winter Olympics.

Head coach:  Alexey Kalintsev    Assistant coach:  Alexey Zherebtsov

Sweden

Switzerland

United States

References

rosters
2006